Heloisa Braz de Oliveira Prieto (born August 26, 1954) is a Brazilian writer, cultural researcher and translator with a master's degree in communication and semiotics, and a PhD in Literary Theory.

Biography
Heloisa began her writing career when she was a still a young kindergarten teacher at the Escola da Vila, in São Paulo.

Her published work, of 94 books in both short story and novel form, embraces fairy tales, fantasy fiction and the retelling of indigenous myths and legends. She is best known as a writer of fiction for children and young adults.

In 2022 she penned her English young adult debut novel, The Musician prefaced by Estas Tonne. 

Heloisa was awarded Best Children's Book for "A Princesa que Não Queria Aprender a Ler" (The Princess Who Didn't Want To Learn To Read), and Best Folklore Book for "Mata" by the Brazilian Writers’ Union. She was awarded Best Book Of Legends for her "O Livro dos Pássaros Mágicos" (The Book Of Magical Birds) by National Book Foundation which also selected her "Andarilhas" (Travelling Tales) in 2016 for their Bologna Catalogue of Books for Children and Young Readers, "A Cidade dos Deitados (The City of Dead), was one of the winners of Best Book for young adults by Brazilian Book Chamber (Câmara Brasileira do Livro), Her "Lá Vem Historia" (Here Comes A Story) has sold over 400,000 copies and became a TV series for children on  TV Cultura.

Her series "Mano", co-written with journalist Gilberto Dimenstein, inspired the movie The Best Things in The World, (Warner Brothers - dir: Laís Bodanzky) which won Best Film for Children and Young People at the 2011 International Film Festival for Children and Young Adults (FICI), in Madrid, Spain.

Apart from her prolific published output she has also spent a lifetime researching myths and legends – both ancient and modern; organizing and curating collections of cross-cultural interest and has created and organized numerous creative writing workshops for children, teenagers and adults. She mentors many young talents and places particular emphasis on supporting and facilitating the artistic and literary aspirations of indigenous people.

Works

References 

1954 births
Brazilian children's writers
20th-century Brazilian women writers
21st-century Brazilian women writers
21st-century Brazilian writers
Brazilian women children's writers
Brazilian translators
Writers from São Paulo
Living people